Elu language may refer to:
 Elu, a Middle Indo-Aryan language, or Prakrit
 Elu language (Papua New Guinea) (ISO 639: elu), an Austronesian language